The Henry M. Jackson School of International Studies (also known as the Jackson School and abbreviated as "JSIS") is a school within the University of Washington's College of Arts and Sciences that specializes in research and instruction in area studies and was founded in 1909 as the Department of Oriental Subjects and is named to honor Henry M. Jackson.

History
The University of Washington established a Department of Oriental Subjects in 1909 under the chairmanship of Herbert Henry Gowen. The department became the School of International Studies in 1976, and, in 1983, was renamed the Henry M. Jackson School of International Studies, in honor of Henry Jackson.

As of 2016, the Jackson School was the United States' largest recipient of United States Department of Education grants in support of area studies and hosted eight National Resource Centers. Its oldest center, the East Asia Center, was established with a grant from the U.S. Department of Defense in 1959 as the Far Eastern Institute. It was followed by the Middle East Center. Other National Resource Centers hosted by the Jackson School are the Canadian Studies Center; Global Studies Center; West European Studies Center; Russia, East Europe, and Central Asian Studies Center; South Asia Center; and Southeast Asia Center.

In 2016 the Jackson School hosted the annual meeting of the Association of Professional Schools of International Affairs, of which it is a founding member.

Instruction
The Jackson School offers Bachelor of Arts degrees in six subjects: Asian studies, Comparative Religion, European studies, International Studies, Jewish Studies, and Latin American & Caribbean studies. It also grants Master of Arts degrees and Doctor of Philosophy degrees in International Studies. Since 2015 it has, additionally, offered a Master of Arts in applied International Studies, which is geared towards "mid-career professionals".

The Jackson School is a full member of the Association of Professional Schools of International Affairs (APSIA), a group of public administration, public policy, and international studies schools.

Publications and collections
In addition to its undergraduate journal, Jackson Journal, the school also houses two refereed journals, the Journal of Japanese Studies and the Journal of Korean Studies.

The Sephardic Studies Digital Library Collection is a collection of digitized works concerning Sephardic Jews, at the University of Washington in Seattle. It was created by Stroum Center for Jewish Studies, part of the Jackson School. The collection contains over 1,500 books and other documents primarily in Ladino, also Ottoman Turkish, Hebrew and French, written from the 16th century up to the mid-20th century.  "Nearly all" of the material in the library came from families in Seattle, which has the third largest Sephardic community in the United States. The University of Washington says the collection has more volumes than the collections of the Library of Congress or of Harvard University. It is said to be the nation's largest or second largest collection of Ladino texts, and the largest electronic collection of such material. Professor Devin Narr began the collection in 2012.

Faculty and alumni
Notable present and former faculty of the school include Darryl N. Johnson, Jere L. Bacharach, France Winddance Twine, T.J. Pempel, Philip N. Howard, and Charles T. Cross.

Notable graduates of the school's programs include Elizabeth J. Perry, Rob McKenna, and Matthew Bannick.

See also
 Daniel J. Evans School of Public Policy and Governance

References

Colleges, schools, and departments of the University of Washington
Schools of international relations in the United States
1909 establishments in Washington (state)